Anna Mani (23 August 1918 – 16 August 2001) was an Indian physicist and meteorologist. She retired as the Deputy Director General of the Indian Meteorological Department and also served as a visiting professor at the Raman Research Institute.
Mani made contributions to the field of meteorological instrumentation, conducted research, and published numerous papers on solar radiation, ozone, and wind energy measurements.

Early life
Anna Modayil Mani was born in 1918 at Peermade, then Travancore, now Kerala, India to a Syrian Christian family. Her father was a civil engineer and an agnostic. She was the seventh of eight children in her family, and a voracious reader. Impressed by Gandhi during Vaikom satyagraha and inspired by his nationalist movement, she took to wearing only khadi garments.

Anna Mani's formative years were spent engrossed in books, and by the age of eight she had read almost all the books in Malayalam at her public library. On her eighth birthday, she declined to accept her family's customary gift of a set of diamond earrings, asking instead for a set of Encyclopædia Britannica. The world of books opened her to new ideas and imbued in her a deep sense of social justice which informed and shaped her life.

Education 
Mani wanted to pursue dancing, but she decided in favour of physics because she liked the subject. In 1939, she graduated from the Pachaiyappas College in Chennai (then Madras), with a B.Sc Honors degree in physics and chemistry. In 1940, she won a scholarship for research in the Indian Institute of Science, Bangalore.
In 1945, she went to Imperial College, London to pursue graduate studies in physics but ended up specializing in meteorological instruments.

Career
After graduating from Pachai college, Mani worked under Prof. C V Raman, researching the optical properties of ruby and diamond. She authored five research papers and submitted her Ph.D. dissertation, but she was not granted a Ph.D. because she did not have a master's degree in physics.
After returning to India in 1948, she joined the meteorology department in Pune, where she published numerous research papers on meteorological instrumentation. 
Mani was responsible for arranging for meteorological instruments imported from Britain. 
By 1953, she had become the head of a division of 121 men.

Mani wished to make India independent in weather instruments. She standardized the drawings of close to one hundred weather instruments. In 1957 and '58, she set up a network of stations to measure solar radiation. In Bangalore, she set up a small workshop that manufactured instruments to measure wind speed and solar energy and worked on developing an apparatus to measure ozone. Mani was made a member of the International Ozone Association. She set up a meteorological observatory and an instrumentation tower at the Thumba rocket launching facility.

She was associated with many scientific organizations, including the Indian National Science Academy, American Meteorological Society, International Solar Energy Society, World Meteorological Organisation (WMO), and the International Association for Meteorology and Atmospheric Physics. In 1987, Mani was a recipient of the INSA K. R. Ramanathan Medal.

Mani was transferred to Delhi in 1969 as the Deputy Director General. In 1975, she served as a WMO consultant in Egypt. She retired as the deputy director general of the Indian Meteorological Department in 1976.

In 1994, Mani suffered a stroke and died on 16 August 2001 in Thiruvananthapuram, a week before her 83rd birthday.

Tributes

The World Meteorological Organization remembered her on her 100th birth anniversary and published her life profile along with an interview.

On 23 August 2022, Google honoured Mani with a Google Doodle on her 104th birth anniversary.

Publications

 1992. Wind Energy Resource Survey in India, vv. 2. xi + 22 pp. Ed. Allied Publ. , 
 1981. Solar Radiation over India x + 548 pp.
 1980. The Handbook for Solar Radiation data for India

References

1918 births
2001 deaths
Indian women physicists
20th-century Indian physicists
Indian meteorologists
Women meteorologists
Scientists from Kerala
Scientists from Thiruvananthapuram
Gandhians
Women Indian independence activists
Indian independence activists from Kerala
20th-century Indian women scientists
Women in Kerala politics
Women of the Kingdom of Travancore
People of the Kingdom of Travancore
People from Idukki district
Women scientists from Kerala
Indian optical physicists
20th-century Indian earth scientists
Indian women earth scientists
Syrian Christians